Ștefan Konyelicska (1 December 1929 – 24 December 2013) was a Romanian rower. He competed in the men's eight event at the 1952 Summer Olympics.

References

External links
 

1929 births
2013 deaths
Romanian male rowers
Olympic rowers of Romania
Rowers at the 1952 Summer Olympics
Sportspeople from Arad, Romania